Kursk is a city and the administrative center of Kursk Oblast, Russia, located at the confluence of the Kur, Tuskar, and Seym rivers. The area around Kursk was the site of a turning point in the Soviet–German struggle during World War II and the site of the largest tank battle in history. Population:

Geography

Urban layout
Kursk was originally built as a fortress city, on a hill dominating the plain. The settlement was surrounded on three sides by steep cliffs and rivers. From the west, the Kur river, from the south and east, the Tuskar river, and from the north, forest thickets approached it. By 1603, Kursk had become a large military, administrative and economic center of a vast territory in the south of the country. The new fortress was built under the leadership of the governor Ivan Polev and Nelyub Ogaryov. The Kursk fortress was given a particularly important role, since in these places the Crimean Tatars, who made regular raids on Russia, traditionally crossed the Seym river, and their main road, the Muravsky Trail, passed east of the city. In this regard, Kursk, despite not being part of the Belgorod Protection Line, became one of the most important fortresses in the southern region. The importance of the Kursk fortress is evident by the fact that in the first half of the 17th century it significantly surpassed other cities in southern Russia in terms of the number of people. In 1616 there were 1600 people in the Kursk garrison.

By 1782, the buildings of Kursk were located on the heights of two hills and in the valley of the Kur River. On the banks of the river were meadows and pastures. The city streets that laid on the slopes of the hills had steep ascents and descents in many places, so that travel in the city was almost everywhere made uphill. The presence of six ravines that cut through the hill of the Nagornaya part significantly hampered the development of Kursk. Heavy rains sometimes eroded the soil of the hillsides and formed ditches and gullies. The plan of Kursk in 1782 was to be implemented in the conditions of the existing buildings of the city. In the 1880s Kursk was already a significant settlement. It housed 14 churches not including the churches of the Znamensky Monastery. Most of them were stone and built around the time period 1730–1786. By 1782 Kursk was comprised almost of wooden houses. Fences and services went out in the direction of the streets, and houses were hidden in the depths of the courtyards. Many streets and lanes were no wider than 2.5 - 3m. The only stone mansion that has survived after the redevelopment to the present time is located at the corner of Pionerov (former Troitskaya) and Gaidar (former Zolotarevskaya) streets. On the eve of Perestroika, there were powerful fortifications and natural obstacles in the center of Kursk. Settlements were located around the city. Cossack and Pushkarnaya were on the slopes of the hills and in the valley of the Kur River, Yamskaya - away from the city, on the plain. At that time, Yamskaya was a small village concentrated around the Vvedenskaya church. The settlements Streletskaya and Kozhevenny were located in the lowlands and were often flooded by the Tuskar river.

The principle of regularity was applied in the structure of the general layout of Kursk. On the plan of 1782 Kursk is shown as consisting of two parts: city or Nagornaya and Zakurnaya. They are separated from each other by the Kura river valley. Each of these parts is divided into regular rectangular blocks located on both sides of the planned main streets - Bolshaya Moskovskaya (Lenina) and Kherson (Dzerzhinsky). In the city Nagornaya part, 19 streets were planned, and in the Zakurnaya part - 24 streets. At the entrance to the city, at the beginning of both Moskovskaya and Kherson streets, it was planned to arrange the entrance squares. The remains of the former prison were destroyed, and “the moat was buried according to the plan of the city, which was most confirmed in 1782, and a square called“ red ”was made in its place. The construction of small areas was also envisaged for a number of churches throughout the city. The territory of both parts of the city, where it was not limited by rivers and deep ravines, was planned to be surrounded by a ditch and a rampart. The area occupied by the city according to the new plan totaled approximately 3060 thousand square fathoms, which corresponds to 12.24 square kilometers. The main drawback of the project was that it did not take into account the complex relief of the Kursk area. The structure of the plan, correct and orderly on paper, required significant revision, additions and even minor changes. The numerous proposals of the Kursk governors A.A. Prozorovsky, F.N. Nicknames, A.B. Debalmena, A.A. Bekleshov, included in the city planning, made it possible to bring the scheme closer to reality.

The purpose of the redevelopment was complete accounting and control of residents. For this, the city was divided under the governor Aleksandr Bekleshov into 4 parts, each of which was managed by a private bailiff. The redevelopment of the city was begun by the provincial surveyor Ivan Fedorovich Bashilov, the district surveyor Ivan Shoshin, the provincial architects Vasily Yakovlev, Lavrenty Kalinovsky. Since 1783, decisions on redevelopment issues were made by a commission in the amount of 3 officials, namely the provincial land surveyor, the mayor and the city magistrate's ratman. The new urban structure - a rectangular quarter with residents of the same income, one estate - greatly facilitated the accounting and control of the inhabitants by the authorities. The center of the city, built up with stone buildings, was to take on a new, "ceremonial" appearance. These requirements were met by the resettlement of residents on the basis of class. The most significant government buildings erected in Kursk by the end of the 18th century. in accordance with the plan, confirmed by Catherine II, these were public places, a prison, a guest house, the main public school, a house of a noble assembly. The building of the bank office, magistrate and post office was located along the red lines of the development of Florovskaya and Moskovskaya streets. The general plan for the development of Kursk was adopted in 1782. It was built according to a regular plan with a clear rectangular grid of streets. It was based on the two main streets Moskovskaya and Khersonskaya (now Lenin and Dzerzhinsky), converging at right angles on Red Square.

A city hospital, a regimental infirmary, an almshouse, and salt shops were built. The most notable private houses of the late 18th century that have survived to this day are the houses of the landowner Denisiev (corner of Sadovaya and Semyonovskaya) and the official Puzanov (Dzerzhinsky, 70), as well as the "house of the treasurer" (corner of Radishcheva and Marata). The main significance of the general city plan of 1782 is that for about 150 years it remained the only document that determined the development of the city of Kursk. The next master plan appeared only in 1947, after the Second World War. The number of residential buildings from 1786 to 1836 increased insignificantly, from 1989 houses to 2782 houses. If any building did not correspond to the confirmed plan, it was demolished.

The bulk of government buildings (offices, post office, magistrate, prison, drinking houses, pharmacies, hospital) were built at the end of the 18th century. At the beginning of the 19th century, construction was carried out insignificantly: offices were repaired, a new prison was built, almost half of Kursk's streets had stone pavements, along which storm sewer grooves were laid. The streets were named Sergievskaya, Tuskarnaya Naberezhnaya, Staraya, Novaya Preobrazhensky, General's line, Soldier's, Druzhininskaya, Pastukhovskaya. Zolotarevskaya, Avraamovskaya, and so on. On July 10, 1808, five settlements (Sloboda) of Kursk (Podyacheskaya, Soldatskaya, Gorodovy Sluzhby, Malyrossiyskaya, Rassylnaya) became part of the city. The settlements surrounding Kursk (Kazatskaya, Pushkarskaya, Yamskaya, Streletskaya) became part of the city only after 1917. The Kozhevennaya Sloboda disappeared from the city plan by the 1940s. The layout of the settlements was as regular as in the provincial center. Urban pasture land was located between the Seim River, on the border of the 3rd district of Kursk and the Big Post Road from Kursk to Oboyan.

History

The first written record of Kursk is dated 1032. It was mentioned as one of Severian towns by Prince Igor in The Tale of Igor's Campaign:

Saddle, brother, your swift steeds. As to mine, they are ready, saddled ahead, near Kursk; as to my Kurskers, they are famous knights—swaddled under war-horns, nursed under helmets, fed from the point of the lance; to them the trails are familiar, to them the ravines are known, the bows they have are strung tight, the quivers, unclosed, the sabers, sharpened; themselves, like gray wolves, they lope in the field, seeking for themselves honor, and for their prince, glory.

The seat of a minor principality, Kursk was raided by the Polovtsians in the 12th and 13th centuries. Destroyed by the Mongols under Batu Khan around 1237, the city was rebuilt no later than 1283. Between 1360 and 1508, it was ruled by Grand Duchy of Lithuania . Kursk joined the centralized Russian state in 1508, becoming its southern border province.

However, a century later the city re-emerged in a new place; date of re-considered grounds Kursk 1586 [9]. In 1596 a new fortress was built, in 1616 it was garrisoned by over 1,300 soldiers. At the beginning of the 17th century, Kursk was repeatedly attacked by the Polish–Lithuanian Commonwealth forces (in 1612, 1616, 1617, and 1634), the  Crimean Khanate, and the Nogai horde, but the Kursk fortress was never taken.

Residents of Oryol and other southern Russian cities were resettled in Kursk (by 1678 2,800 had been resettled). The city developed due to its advantageous geographical position on the shortest route from Moscow to the Crimea and from Moscow to Kiev. It was an important center of the corn trade with Ukraine and hosted an important fair, which took place annually under the walls of the monastery of Our Lady of Kursk.

It was successively part of the Kiev Governorate (1708–1727), Belgorod Governorate (1727–1779), and Kursk Viceroyalty (1779–1797). The town status was granted to Kursk in 1779, and it became the administrative center of Kursk Governorate in 1797.

After a fire in 1781 devastated Kursk, a new plan for the city was developed in which a market center would be placed in the central square, known as the Red Square. In 1768, the Voskresensko-Ilinskaya Church was built. In 1778 both the baroque Sergiev Cathedral and Trinity-Sergius Cathedral were completed. The city opened its first school for nobility in 1783. A men's gymnasium was opened in 1808 and a seminary in 1817. A women's gymnasium was opened in 1872.

At the beginning of the 20th century Kursk played a dominant role in the food industry (Kvilitsu AK, one of the largest breweries in Russia, operated in Kursk) and in other industries; in the 1900s, the city had 4 sitoproboynye shops (of which the largest was the Tikhonov works, whose products were exported to Germany, Austria-Hungary, etc.). There were several engineering enterprises operating in Kursk (in 1914 there were seven, including a railroad one). The working conditions in the factories of Kursk were harsh, and workers' strikes were frequent (for instance, the workers at the sugar mill went on strike in 1901–1903). The Kursk workers also participated in the general political strike during the 1905 Russian Revolution.

On November 26 (December 9 - new style), 1917 the Soviets took power in Kursk. On September 20, 1919, the city was taken over by the troops under the command of General Denikin; however, on November 19, 1919, Kursk was retaken by the Red Army.

The Soviet government valued Kursk for its rich deposits of iron ore and developed it into one of the major railroad hubs in the Russian southwest. In 1932, Yamskaya Sloboda was incorporated into the city. In 1935, Kursk got its first tram system. Sometime in the 1930s, the area of the city of Kursk was divided into Leninsky District (the left bank of the Kura River), Dzerzhinsky District (the right bank of the Kura River) and Kirov District (Yamskaya Sloboda). In 1937 Stalinsky District was formed at the southern outskirts of the city.

In July 1943, the Germans launched Operation Citadel in an attempt to recapture Kursk. During the resulting Battle of Kursk, the village of Prokhorovka near Kursk became the center of a major armoured engagement – the Battle of Prokhorovka – between Soviet and German forces, which is widely considered to have been one of the largest tank battles in history. Operation Citadel was the last major German offensive against the Soviet Union.

Rebuilding efforts in the city began in February 1944. The cultural life recovered as well: on 19 February a cinema was reopened and on February 27 - a drama theatre. In 1953 the tram system began operating again. By 1950 the urban economy had been completely restored. On 17 August 1956, Stalinsky District was renamed Promishlenost District, and Dzerzhinsky District was abolished and its territory divided between Promishlenost and Leninsky Districts.

In 2009, for the first time in 90 years at the site of Theotokos of Kursk, the most revered icon in the Russian Orthodox Church, received the name Hodigitria Russian diaspora.

Until 2010, Kursk had the status of historical settlement, but the Russian Ministry of Culture deprived the city of this status on 29 July 2010 in resolution No. 418/339.

On 29 October 2011, for the first time in 30 years, the city opened a new firehouse for the protection of the Central District, with modern equipment. In 2012, Kursk celebrated its 980th anniversary.

Administrative and municipal status
Kursk is the administrative center of the oblast and, within the framework of administrative divisions, it also serves as the administrative center of Kursky District, even though it is not a part of it. As an administrative division, it is incorporated separately as the city of oblast significance of Kursk—an administrative unit with the status equal to that of the districts. As a municipal division, the city of oblast significance of Kursk is incorporated as Kursk Urban Okrug.

Economy and infrastructure

In addition to its importance as an administrative hub, Kursk is important as an industrial centre.  Activity focuses on iron based industry, the chemical sector and a large food processing industry, reflecting the richness of agriculture in the surrounding "Black Earth" region.

Particularly noteworthy is the so-called Kursk Magnetic Anomaly (Russian: Курская магнитная аномалия), the world's largest known iron-ore reserve, where the iron content of the ore ranges from 35% up to 60%.

The oldest of the Kursk reactors has been operational since 1977, and the newest of them since 1986.

Attractions
The oldest building in Kursk is the upper church of the Trinity Monastery, a good example of the transition style characteristic of Peter the Great's early reign. The oldest lay building is the so-called Romodanovsky Chamber, although it was erected in all probability in the mid-18th century, when the Romodanovsky family had ceased to exist.

The city cathedral was built between 1752 and 1778 in the splendid Baroque style and was decorated so sumptuously that many art historians attributed it to Bartolomeo Rastrelli. Although Rastrelli's authorship is out of the question, the cathedral is indeed the most impressive monument of Elizabethan Baroque not to be commissioned by the imperial family or built in the imperial capital.

The cathedral has two stories, with the lower church consecrated to St. Sergius of Radonezh and the upper one — to the Theotokos of Kazan. The upper church is noted for an intricate icon screen which took sixteen years to complete. The three-story cathedral bell tower derives peculiar interest from the fact that Seraphim of Sarov, whose father took part in construction works, survived an accidental fall from its top floor at the age of seven. The Resurrection Church is also shown where St. Seraphim was baptized.

The interior was formerly as rich as colored marbles, gilding, and frescoes could make it. During the Soviet period, the cathedral was desecrated, four lateral domes and twin belltowers over the entrance pulled down. There are plans to restore the church to its former glory.

The modern city is a home for several universities: Kursk State Medical University, State Technical University, Kursk State University (former Pedagogical University) and Agricultural Academy, as well as the private Regional Open Social Institute (ROSI). There are also modern shrines and memorials commemorating the Battle of Kursk, both in the city and in Prokhorovka.

The Command Station Bunker & Museum was built specifically in memorial of the courageous Russian T-34 tank units that fought in the Battle of Kursk, where a T-34 tank is on display. Over 6,000 armored vehicles fought in close range over the open territory near Kursk in 1943. This battle stopped the German advance into the Kursk Salient, and was a turning point of World War II on the Eastern Front.

Kursk played a role in the Cold War as host to Khalino air base.

Nearby is Tsentralno-Chernozemny Zapovednik, a large section of steppe soil that has never been plowed. It is used for a variety of research purposes.

Education

Transportation

Since 1868 there has been a railway connection between Kursk and Moscow. Kursk is located on a major railway line between Moscow and Kharkov, with trains also linking the city to Voronezh and Kiev. The Kursk Vostochny Airport provides domestic flights. Public transport includes buses, trolleybuses, and trams. Since 2007, the public transport introduced a satellite navigation system. The total length of the road network of the city of Kursk is 595.8 km, of which 496.2 km of roads are paved. Roads of the city have access to federal highway M2 "Crimea", as well as on the highway A144 (Kursk - Voronezh - Saratov) and P199 (border with Ukraine).

Kursk bound intercity bus routes to cities and towns Kursk region and neighboring regions (Belgorod Oblast, Bryansk Oblast, Voronezh Oblast, Oryol Oblast), as well as Moscow, St. Petersburg and cities of Ukraine: Kharkiv and Sumy. Long-distance buses arrive and depart from the bus station "Kursk", located in the North-West part of the city.

On September 5, 2011, in Kursk commissioned automated monitoring system fare. Implementation of the system in operation is carried out by Kursk Integrated Ticket System was to take place in three stages: At the initial stage is implemented partially open version of the system, in which the sale of tickets and travel control social cards carried in the cabin of public transport conductors with handheld validators, the second stage involves the installation of stationary validators, third - commissioning turnstiles. After completion of the implementation, the automated monitoring system drive will operate in "closed" mode : turnstiles will be installed at the entrance and exit of passengers. As of September 2011 turnstiles installed on 44 buses, 10 trolley buses and trams 5.

Culture and sports
Kursk State University is home to the Russian Chamber Orchestra, under the direction of conductor and trumpet soloist Sergey Proskurin. The orchestra performs regularly, tours internationally and has produced multiple CDs.

Pushkin Theater located in the center of the city. It has permanent company as well as visiting shows.

In 2016, the Russian Women's Hockey League expanded to Kursk, with new club Dynamo Kursk.

The band Little Tragedies are originally from Kursk.

Media
Kursk hams since 1935 could receive television broadcasts from Moscow. In 1960, the Committee on Radio and Television was created by the Kursk Oblast Executive Committee. The first transmission of local television aired January 14, 1961. Main fixed line and cellular operators are active in the city.

Climate

Honors
A minor planet 3073 Kursk discovered by Soviet astronomer Nikolai Chernykh in 1979 is named after the city.
The Russian submarine Kursk was named after the city.

Notable people
Georgy Sviridov, composer
Valery Chaplygin, Olympic champion, cyclist
Alexander Deyneka, painter, sculptor
Alexander Rutskoy, politician
Seraphim of Sarov, monk and saint
The Tolmachevy Twins, singers
Alexander Povetkin, Olympic champion, boxer
Alexey Ivanovich Borozdin, musical therapist
Yevgeny Klevtsov, Olympic medalist, cyclist
Vyacheslav Klykov, sculptor
Kazimir Malevich, painter
Sergei Puskepalis, actor
Mikhail Shchepkin, actor
Little Tragedies, music band
Pavel A. Pevzner, scientist
Nikolay Karamyshev, racing driver

Twin towns – sister cities

Kursk is twinned with:

 Bar, Montenegro

 Dębno, Poland
 Donetsk, Ukraine
 Feodosia, Ukraine
 Gomel, Belarus
 Izmail, Ukraine
 Niš, Serbia
 Zviahel, Ukraine
 Novopolotsk, Belarus
 Polotsk, Belarus
 Primorsko, Bulgaria
 Speyer, Germany
 Sukhumi, Georgia
 Sumy, Ukraine
 Tiraspol, Moldova
 Užice, Serbia
 Witten, Germany

Former twin towns:
 Tczew, Poland
 Motihari , India

On 8 March 2022, the Polish city of Tczew ended its partnership with Kursk as a response to the 2022 Russian invasion of Ukraine.

References

Notes

Sources

External links

 
Official website of Kursk 
 Kursk Business Directory kursk.jsprav.ru 
Kursk music events
Kursk road police

 
Kursky Uyezd
Cities and towns in Kursk Oblast